Runyon Lake (formerly known as Fountain Lakes) is located in Pueblo, Colorado. It was originally used as a dredge pond for the Rocky Mountain Steel Mill, it is approximately 35 acres in size, and is fed by the Arkansas River.

It is used solely for fishing and is stocked by the Colorado Parks and Wildlife. Boating is restricted to hand launched craft under 15 feet in length (including float tubes and personal pontoons). Boats may be propelled by hand, wind, or electric motors only. Ice fishing, swimming, open fires and camping are all prohibited.

Fish
Runyon Lake is home to several different fish species. Included species are white crappie, green sunfish, bluegill, black bullhead, saugeye, channel catfish, large mouth bass and rainbow trout. The lake has previously held the record in Colorado for the biggest catfish catch. The catfish was 38.5 inches long and weighed 29.5 pounds.

References

External links
   map

Runyon
Pueblo, Colorado
Protected areas of Pueblo County, Colorado
Tourist attractions in Pueblo, Colorado
Bodies of water of Pueblo County, Colorado
Wildlife management areas of Colorado